Superchips Ltd was a British company specialising in electronic engine tuning of cars. It was established in 1977 by Peter Wales as P.J. Detection Techniques, and was renamed Superchips in 1991. The company is based in Milton Keynes, and has dealers of its products worldwide.

The company provides engine control unit (ECU) upgrades to produce more power and torque for a wide range of popular vehicles such as:
BMW 1 Series
Ford Focus
Renault Clio V6
Škoda Fabia
Volkswagen Golf

The additional power is produced by re-mapping the ECU's settings by changing various settings created by the car's original manufacturer. The company also produces the Bluefin tool that plugs into a car's diagnostic port and allows for re-mapping to be done at home.

American subsidiary 
In 1992, Superchips Inc. was established in Sanford, Florida, US and developed products for the North American market. The subsidiary was sold to MSD Ignition in 2005 for $40 million. The company was merged with Edge Products in 2011 and the Superchips brand of products is now distributed by Powerteq, LLC.

Motorsport
Superchips was the official tuning partner of Volkswagen Racing UK and provided custom remapping on all VW Racing UK's cars for Volkswagen Racing Cup. The company also provides tuning to Mini Coopers in the Scottish Mini Challenge, and to all cars in the BRDC's Single Seater Championship at Silverstone.

References

External links
 Official Superchips website

Automotive companies of the United Kingdom
Companies based in Milton Keynes
Milton Keynes